Alia Sazana Azahari (born 9 December 1991) is a Malaysian sport shooter. She competed in the women's 25 metre pistol event at the 2018 Commonwealth Games, winning the bronze medal.

References

External links 
 https://www.astroawani.com/berita-malaysia/mco-turns-national-shooter-food-entrepreneur-278588

1991 births
Living people
Malaysian female sport shooters
Place of birth missing (living people)
Shooters at the 2018 Commonwealth Games
Commonwealth Games bronze medallists for Malaysia
Commonwealth Games medallists in shooting
Shooters at the 2014 Asian Games
Shooters at the 2018 Asian Games
Southeast Asian Games medalists in shooting
Southeast Asian Games gold medalists for Malaysia
Competitors at the 2015 Southeast Asian Games
Competitors at the 2017 Southeast Asian Games
Asian Games competitors for Malaysia
21st-century Malaysian women
Medallists at the 2018 Commonwealth Games